The Question of Lay Analysis is a 1926 book by Sigmund Freud, the founder of psychoanalysis, advocating the right of non-doctors, or 'lay' people, to be psychoanalysts. It was written in response to Theodore Reik's being prosecuted for being a non-medical, or lay, analyst in Austria.

It is in this book that Freud compares the sexual life of adult women to a "dark continent":

References

1926 non-fiction books
Books about psychoanalysis
Books by Sigmund Freud